Spire Credit Union (stylized SPIRE Credit Union) is a not-for-profit financial cooperative that was founded as the Twin City Co-ops Credit Union in 1934. Spire is headquartered in Falcon Heights, Minnesota, and currently serves over 153,000 members, and controls more than $2.1 billion in assets.

History
Spire was created in 1934 by Edgar Archer, an employee of the Midland Cooperative Oil Association. Edgar Archer needed a loan to be able to pay his debts, so he started a credit union. By February 1934, enough of his fellow workers agreed, and seven of them applied for a certificate of the organization. Spire was officially incorporated on March 13, 1934. In 2011, Spire operated ten branches in the Twin Cities area. In July 2014, the organization – then named Spire Federal Credit Union – was voted to change from a federally-chartered into a state-chartered financial institution, and was renamed Spire Credit Union. In 2014, Greater Minnesota Credit Union (GMCU) merged with Spire, adding six branches in the greater Minnesota area.  In 2017, Peoples Community Credit Union members approved a merger with Spire, adding a branch location in Hopkins, Minnesota. In 2019, Energy Services Federal Credit Union members approved a merger with Spire, adding a branch location in St. Cloud, Minnesota. In 2019, Electrus FCU voted to merge with Spire. In 2021, Diversified Credit Union voted to merge with Spire, adding a branch location in Waseca, Minnesota. Also in 2021, Central Hanna Employees Credit Union voted to merge with Spire, adding a branch in Keewatin, Minnesota. In 2022, HBI Employees Credit Union voted to merge with Spire. Spire operates a total of 22 branches.

Membership 
Anyone with a Spire Account becomes a member of the credit union. There are four qualifications for becoming a member:

 You live, work, worship, volunteer, attend school, or do business in a community located in one of the following counties:
 Aitkin, Anoka, Benton, Blue Earth, Burnett, Carlton, Carver, Chisago, Crow Wing, Dakota, Douglas, Hennepin, Isanti, Itasca, Kanabec, La Sueur, Mille Lacs, Morrison, Pierce, Pine, Polk, Ramsey, Rice, Scott, Sherburne, St. Croix, St. Louis, Stearns, Waseca, Washington, Wright
 You are an immediate family member of a current member.
 You work for a company or organization that offers Spire Credit Union as an employee benefit. Check if your organization offers Spire membership.
 If you don't meet one of the three options above but you live in Minnesota or Wisconsin, you may still be eligible for membership by joining the InSPIREation Foundation.

Partnerships 
Spire Credit Union has multiple active partnerships with many local organizations including the St. Paul Saints (SPIRE Home Run Porch, SPIRE Sun Deck, Official Checking Account), the St. Cloud Rox (Official Checking Account), Ogilvie Raceway (SPIRE Grandstand), and the Minnesota United FC (Official Credit Union).

References

External links
Official website

Credit unions based in Minnesota
Organizations established in 1934